Giovanni Battista Comparini (died 1616) was a Roman Catholic prelate who served as Bishop of Fondi (1591–1616).

Biography 
On 5 April 1591, Giovanni Battista Comparini was appointed during the papacy of Pope Gregory XIV as Bishop of Fondi.
He served as Bishop of Fondi until his death in 1616.

References 

16th-century Italian Roman Catholic bishops
17th-century Italian Roman Catholic bishops
Bishops appointed by Pope Gregory XIV
1616 deaths